Jonathan Patrick Wimberly (born May 29, 1983) is an American record producer, songwriter, multi-instrumentalist, composer and mixing engineer best known as being one-half of the synth-pop duo Chairlift. The band parted ways in 2017 so Patrick and former bandmate Caroline Polachek could focus on their careers as producers/songwriters.

Wimberly has worked on Grammy-winning albums such as Beyoncé's self-titled album and A Seat at the Table by Solange, both of which topped the Billboard charts, and produced Joji's five-times Platinum-certified song "Slow Dancing In The Dark", as well as MGMT's album Little Dark Age and the new fifth studio album Let's Start Here by Lil Yachty. He also has writing and production credits on critically lauded albums by Blood Orange, Ellie Goulding, Paloma Faith, Empress Of, Wet, and many others. In addition, Wimberly has scored for both film and television, with an example being High Maintenance on HBO.

Career

Producing 
Wimberly has been actively producing records since 2010. Since the disbandment of Chairlift in 2017, he has spent the majority of his time producing records and collaborating with different artists. In 2018, he produced MGMT's fourth record Little Dark Age. Public Access T.V.'s February 2018 release Street Safari was also produced by him.  This record was produced at his studio in Brooklyn. Wimberly produced the single "Sweet Sound of Ignorance" by Soko, French-born and LA-based singer-songwriter and musician, which came out in 2017.

Wimberly has also worked with Solange, Beyoncé, and Dev Hynes.  He was a collaborator with Solange from 2011, and produced several tracks on her 2016 album A Seat at the Table, which reached number 1 on the Billboard 200. Wimberly produced "No Angel" with Caroline Polachek, which was featured on Beyoncé's self-titled album in 2013, which also was a number 1 record on the Billboard charts. In 2016, Wimberly worked with Dev Hynes of Blood Orange in which he produced, composed, and performed on several tracks. During the same year, he also worked with Wet to produce their debut record Don't You. Chairlift released their third album during this time, which Wimberly had a prominent role in producing with Polachek. Kelsey Lu co-produced her live EP Church with Wimberly in 2016.

Wimberly produced the Das Racist album Relax, also recording and mixing, and produced Acrylic's album Lives and Treasure. Both were 2011 releases. Latin singer Tecla released We Are The Lucky Ones in 2013, which Wimberly produced.

Chairlift 
Originally from Nashville, TN Patrick met bandmate Caroline Polachek at the University of Colorado in 2004. After moving to New York City in 2006, Patrick and Caroline, along with former band member Aaron Pfenning, formed Chairlift in early 2007.

In 2008, Patrick went on tour with Chairlift to open for the experimental indie rockers Ariel Pink's Haunted Graffiti. Shortly thereafter, Chairlift's song "Bruises" was featured in the September 2008 commercial for the iPod nano; becoming their most widely known and breakout single following the release of their debut album Does You Inspire You.

Following Does You Inspire You, Patrick worked on Chairlift's 2012 sophomore album Something (Chairlift album). The album features singles "Amanaemonesia" (2011), "Met Before" (2012), and "I Belong In Your Arms" (2012)

In January 2016, Chairlift released their third and final album, Moth.

Collaborations 
Patrick has collaborated on many records and television series, his most recent collaborations include working with MGMT on their fourth LP, Little Dark Age.  Public Access T.V. also enlisted Wimberly to produce their upcoming sophomore LP Street Safari.  His television contributions include composing music for the HBO series High Maintenance on the "Globo" episode.

Some of Patrick's most notable collaborations include working with Beyoncé on her self-titled surprise album Beyoncé on the track "No Angel." Beyoncé debuted at number one on the Billboard 200  Patrick procured this opportunity being a part of Solange's band, in which he was also a pivotal part of her 2016 LP A Seat at the Table. Among Patrick's collaborations in the same year includes work with Dev Hynes (Blood Orange) on his album Freetown Sound, where Patrick played drums, percussion, and bass on song "Desirée." He worked on Wet's second album Don't You as well. In 2014, Patrick mixed Arcadia, the debut album of Caroline Polachek's side project Ramona Lisa. Within the same period of time, he also mixed Tune-Yards album Nikki Nack and worked with Kelela and Tink on their song "Want It."

Patrick's collaborations reach across a comprehensive spectrum of artists and genres, including working with Fort Lean on their 2012 Change Your Name EP.  During this point, he also worked with Latin singer, Tecla, in which he composed, produced, and performed on the record We Are The Lucky Ones.  Das Racist also employed Patrick's talents during this period of time as well, having him thoroughly collaborate on their album entitled, Relax.

More recently, Patrick gained recognition for producing Joji's famous song "Slow Dancing In The Dark" (which was certified five-times Platinum in November 2022) and his subsequent album Nectar. He also worked on critically acclaimed albums by MGMT, Ellie Goulding, Paloma Faith, and James Vincent McMorrow, and the new fifth studio album Let's Start Here by Lil Yachty.

Television appearances 
Patrick has had multiple television appearances. In 2016, Patrick appeared on Saturday Night Live with Solange performing "Cranes in The Sky" and "Don't Touch My Hair." This was not the first time he has appeared live with Solange, as he played alongside her on December 10, 2012, on  Late Night With Jimmy Fallon performing "Losing You," her lead single, off her True EP. In 2013, Patrick appeared on Last Call with Carson Daly, with fellow Chairlift band member Caroline Polachek performing "Amanaemonesia", Something.  His first appearance on television with Chairlift, was on The Late Late Show With Craig Ferguson playing their breakout single "Bruises" off their first LP.  Other notable television performances, include playing drums with Das Racist on November 28, 2011, playing their hit "Michael Jackson" on The Tonight Show with Conan O'Brien.

Discography

Albums / EPs

Singles

Mixing credits

Production / Writing credits

Remixes

Composer credits

References

External links 
 Chairlift

Living people
American multi-instrumentalists
American electronic musicians
Musicians from Nashville, Tennessee
University of Colorado alumni
Songwriters from New York (state)
Songwriters from Tennessee
Record producers from Tennessee
Record producers from New York (state)
1983 births